Christopher Hoiles Lee is Founder and Managing Partner of AIG Highstar Capital, a fourth generation fund manager, was formed in 1998 to make value added, operationally focused private equity investments in infrastructure and has invested over $5 billion for its limited partners and co-investors.

Lee graduated from  Johns Hopkins University in 1974 with a BA in history. He attended the London School of Economics during 1975. Prior to founding Highstar, his career in finance began in 1977, including periods with Chase Manhattan and Lehman Brothers, and as CFO of a NYSE listed company based in Mexico City, Grupo Tribasa. He has  a particular expertise in public private partnerships, and appears in the media on infrastructure related issues.

Recently he co-authored an Op Ed for Politico with Maryland Governor Martin O'Malley on Ports America's recent 50-year PPP in the Port of Baltimore.

He  serves as a member of both the Board of Trustees of  Johns Hopkins. and the Dean's Advisory Board for the Zanvyl Krieger School of Arts and Sciences at Johns Hopkins. He is also a Vice Chair of the South Street Seaport Museum in New York.

References

American businesspeople

Johns Hopkins University alumni
Alumni of the London School of Economics
Living people

Year of birth missing (living people)